Steinach is a river of Hesse and Baden-Württemberg, in the southwest of Germany. It passes through Abtsteinach, Heiligkreuzsteinach and Schönau and flows into the Neckar in Neckarsteinach.

See also
List of rivers of Baden-Württemberg
List of rivers of Hesse

References

Rivers of Baden-Württemberg
Rivers of Hesse
Rivers of Germany